CTH or cth may refer to

 CTH Public Company Limited, Thai cable and satellite TV company
 Calum Thomas Hood
 Chalmers University of Technology
Honduras Workers' Confederation - Confederación de Trabajadores de Honduras
China General Aviation Corporation (ICAO airline designator)
 Chadwell Heath railway station, London (National Rail station code)
 City Hall MRT station, Singapore (MRT station abbreviation)
 Commonwealth of Australia, when citing legislation
 Confederation of Tourism and Hospitality -  an industry association in the United Kingdom
 County Trunk Highway, the designation for county highways in the U.S. state of Wisconsin
 A programming code for simulation of highly transient shock physics and large deformations such as in Shaped charge explosive devices
 Cystathionine gamma-lyase - an enzyme which converts cystathionine into cysteine
 Chapo Trap House -  an American political and humor podcast
 Australian Government, also known as the Commonwealth Government; usually used as a suffix to laws enacted by the federal government 
 Commonwealth, the traditional English term for a political community founded for the common good
 Hyperbolic cotangent function, one of the hyperbolic functions in trigonometry